SS Auby was a Sarawakian Cargo ship that was scuttled at Batavia, Netherlands East Indies on 5 March 1942 during the Battle of Java.

Construction 
Auby was built at the Soc. Esercizio Bacini shipyard in Riva Trigoso, Italy in 1908. Where she was launched and completed that same year. The ship could generate 47 n.h.p..

Sinking 
Auby was scuttled at Batavia, Netherlands East Indies on 5 March 1942 during the Battle of Java to prevent her falling into Japanese possession, after having helped evacuate civilians from Singapore to Tanjung Priok.

References

1908 ships
Cargo ships of Italy
Scuttled vessels
Maritime incidents in March 1942
Ships built in Italy
World War II shipwrecks in the Java Sea
Cargo ships of Belgium